Connemara is a district in the west of Ireland. Connemara or Conamara may also refer to:

Places
 Connemara, Alberta, a locality in Canada
 Conamara Chaos, a region of chaotic terrain on Jupiter's moon Europa
 Connemara Station, a cattle station in Queensland

Arts, entertainment, and media
 "Les Lacs du Connemara", a 1981 song by French singer Michel Sardou
 "The Hills of Connemara", an Irish drinking song by Sean McCarthy about Irish moonshine (or Poitín)

Other uses
 Connemara, a brand of Irish whiskey produced by the Cooley Distillery 
 Carl Sandburg Home National Historic Site, the former home of poet Carl Sandburg in Flat Rock, North Carolina, which he named after the Connemara region
 Connemara pony, a breed of horse
 Connemara Public Library, a public library in Chennai, Tamil Nadu India